Siokunichthys is a genus of pipefishes native to the Indian and Pacific Oceans.  One species, Siokunichthys nigrolineatus, has a commensal relationship with mushroom corals of the genus Fungia.

Species
There are currently six recognized species in this genus:
 Siokunichthys bentuviai E. Clark, 1966
 Siokunichthys breviceps J. L. B. Smith, 1963 (Softcoral pipefish)
 Siokunichthys herrei Herald, 1953 (Herre's pipefish)
 Siokunichthys nigrolineatus C. E. Dawson, 1983
 Siokunichthys southwelli (Duncker, 1910) (Southwell's pipefish)
 Siokunichthys striatus R. Fricke, 2004 (New Caledonian soft-coral pipefish)

References

External links

Syngnathidae
Marine fish genera